The World Farmers Organization (WFO) with headquarters in Rome, Italy, established 2011, is an international organization of farmers with a focus on agroecology, farming typologies, food chains, indigenous peoples, and mountain farming.
The WFO aims to strengthen agricultural producers and farmers' positions within value chains, with a particular focus on smallholder farmers. As such, it closely cooperates with the FAO.
The WFO is also acting as a successor to the now-defunct IFAP with its controversial focus on representing middle-class to rich farmers from the Global North, and cooperates with Bayer in several projects (WFO Gymnasium, "Cattle4Care").

See also
IFOAM

References

External links
World Farmers' Organisation

Farmers' organizations